Inchcape Shipping Services (ISS) is a British multinational  ports and marine management company headquartered in London.

Today ISS has operations in 60 countries across the Americas, Asia Pacific, Europe, Middle East, South Asia and Africa.

ISS is currently owned by London-based private equity firm Epiris LLP, having been sold by Istithmar World, the investment arm of Dubai World in 2022.

History
In 1847, William Mackinnon and Robert Mackenzie formed the Mackinnon Mackenzie Company (MMC), a general merchanting partnership based in Calcutta. MMC eventually came to be known as Inchcape plc.

In 1999 Inchcape Shipping Services was spun out and sold to private equity firm Electra Fleming.

The firm, by then known as Electra Partners, sold ISS to Istithmar World, the investment arm of the government of Dubai, for $285m in 2006.

In February 2010, the Financial Times reported that Istithmar was looking for buyers of ISS for between $600–700m.

On 4 April 2022 it was announced that the ISS would be sold back to Epiris LLP, the latest incarnation of Electra Partners, for an undisclosed sum.

References

DP World
British brands